"Ill Street Blues" is the first single from American hip hop duo Kool G Rap & DJ Polo's 1992 album Live and Let Die. Released with "Fuck U Man" as a B-side, it was later also featured on the compilation albums Killer Kuts (1994), The Best of Cold Chillin' (2000) and Greatest Hits (2002).

Background
A hardcore hip hop song with elements of Mafioso rap, "Ill Street Blues" sees Kool G Rap tell the story from the perspective of a career criminal and mob henchman. The song is driven by bluesy piano loops sampled from Joe Williams' "Get Out of my Life", and G Rap recalled in a 2014 interview: 

The song's first verse tells of G Rap and his sidekick Bill Blass being sent to retrieve money from a cocaine-addicted bartender named Jimmy who is in debt to the mob. He is unable to pay the money, however, and they are instructed to kill him instead. Blass distracts him while G Rap enters the bar through the back entrance, and kills Jimmy by shooting him in the back of the head and stabbing him with a knife. He describes committing various robberies in verse two and, in verse three, tells of how his mob boss betrayed him and attempted to have him and Blass killed. They take revenge by throwing him from a skyscraper.

Speaking of the identity of Bill Blass, his sidekick in the song, G Rap said: 

"Ill Street Blues" was recorded at Powerplay Studios and Chung King Studios in New York City.

Music video
The music video for "Ill Street Blues", Kool G Rap & DJ Polo's fourth, was directed by Lionel C. Martin and portrays some of the events mentioned in the song.

Critical acclaim
About.com ranked "Ill Street Blues" at #35 in their list of 100 greatest rap songs.

Samples
"Ill Street Blues" samples the following songs:
"Get Out of My Life" by Joe Williams featuring The Jazz Orchestra

And was later sampled on:
"At the Top" by M.O.B. (Massive of Brooklyn)
"Bronx Tale" by Fat Joe featuring KRS-One
"Bad Boy Elect" by Sleepy Wonder
"Make a Buck" by Count Bass D featuring MF Doom
"Tuned Mass Damper" by El-P
"Ill Street Blues" by DJ Mitsu the Beats and Fat Loop

Track listing

12"
A-side
 "Ill Street Blues" (Illest Version) (3:46)
 "Ill Street Blues" (Acapella) (3:24)

B-side
 "Fuck U Man" (4:10)
 "Ill Street Blues" (Instrumental) (3:45)

Cassette
A-side
 "Ill Street Blues" (Illest Version) (3:46)
 "Ill Street Blues" (Acapella) (3:24)

B-side
 "Ill Street Blues" (Instrumental) (3:45)
 "Fuck U Man" (4:10)

CD
 "Ill Street Blues" (Illest Version) (3:49)
 "Ill Street Blues" (Acapella) (3:28)
 "Ill Street Blues" (Instrumental) (3:49)
 "Fuck U Man" (4:01)

Charts

References

External links
 "Ill Street Blues" at Discogs

1992 singles
Kool G Rap songs
Songs written by Kool G Rap
Gangsta rap songs
Hardcore hip hop songs
Songs about crime
1992 songs
Cold Chillin' Records singles
Warner Records singles
Song recordings produced by Trackmasters
Mafioso rap songs